The Coffeewood Correctional Center is a state prison for men located in Mitchells, Culpeper County, Virginia, owned and operated by the Virginia Department of Corrections.  

The facility was opened in 1994 and has a working capacity of 1193 prisoners held at a medium security level.

References

Prisons in Virginia
Buildings and structures in Culpeper County, Virginia
1994 establishments in Virginia